Abdur Rauf Khan (born 9 December 1978) is a Pakistani former cricketer who played for the Pakistani national cricket team between 2008 and 2009. A right-arm fast-medium bowler, Khan made his first-class debut in October 1999.

He joined the national squad for series against South Africa and Bangladesh in 2002/03 but did play an international in either. He has since toured India with the Pakistan A team.  He made his ODI debut against Zimbabwe in the 2007–08 season but played only one match in the series.  He came over to England in 2000 and played in the Cambridgeshire Premier League for Wisbech Town Cricket Club taking over 50 wickets. In 2006 he featured as overseas player for Herefordshire club Brockhampton, taking 56 wickets and scoring over 500 runs.

In June 2009 following consistent performances in domestic cricket Rauf was chosen in the 15-man Pakistani squad to tour Sri Lanka at the end of the month. He made his debut in the full Pakistani Test team for the Test Match against Sri Lanka played at Galle from 4–8 July 2009. He got his first wicket which was a big one of Mahela Jayawardene and finished with 3 wickets in the match. His first Test match innings was 31 as a nightwatchman. After a decent performance he was retained for the second Test starting on 12 July. He got a pair twice trapped lbw by Nuwan Kulasekara as Sri Lanka won the series. He played in the Boxing Day Test at the MCG but only picked up 1 wicket and 8 runs as Australia won. He also dropped Shane Watson when the Australian batsman was on 99, allowing him to run through to complete his maiden Test century. He was dropped for the next match.

References

External links
 

1978 births
Living people
Pakistani cricketers
Pakistan Test cricketers
Pakistan One Day International cricketers
Pakistan Twenty20 International cricketers
Sui Northern Gas Pipelines Limited cricketers
Lahore Division cricketers
Pakistan Customs cricketers
Allied Bank Limited cricketers
Multan cricketers
Baluchistan cricketers
Khan Research Laboratories cricketers
Port Qasim Authority cricketers
Faisalabad cricketers
Baluchistan Bears cricketers
Faisalabad Wolves cricketers
Cricketers from Okara, Pakistan
Azad Kashmiri people